The educational system in California consists of public, NPS, and private schools in the U.S. state of California, including the public University of California, California State University, and California Community Colleges systems, private colleges and universities, and elementary, middle, and high schools.

History

In Spanish colonial California, a prerequisite for promotion above the rank of corporal and the core criteria for promotion beyond, was literacy. This formed an incentive to both learn to read and write for oneself and provide this for one's children through whatever means possible. The Spanish policy at the time, as a means of controlling their citizens, was in opposition to popular education. The first recorded school in California was opened in 1795 by Manuel de Vargas, a retired sergeant, in San Jose. Small schools taught by retired soldiers continued to operate through the revolution years and independence from Spain in 1821. José Antonio Carrillo is one of the few school teachers known by name from this time.

Attempts were made to import educators to California from elsewhere in New Spain. Though at that time, fairly serious prison sentences were commuted in exchange for immigrating to California. Governor Pablo Vicente de Solá made education a core priority. After requests for government funds for school teachers went unanswered, he used his own wealth to fund a fellowship for two Spanish professors to establish a high school in Monterey. After several weeks they concluded life in California as unbearable and left. Subsequent governors continued to address the education issue but failed to gain traction for higher education. The first truancy law was issued in 1828 by Governor José María de Echeandía, ordered the commanding officers to compel parents to send their children to the schools which he had established. 

In 1829, throughout Alta California, there were 339 students in 11 primary schools. During this time a noted educator in San Diego was Friar Antonio Menendez and his 18 pupils. Private schools operated throughout this time. An example was opened by Don Guillermo Arnel near present-day Salinas on December 10, 1833 on his plantation Rancho El Alisal. He named his university preparatory school "El Seminario del Patrocinio de San Jose" or "Colegio de San Jose". For the following 20 years of Mexican administration the public school system ebbed and flowed. At times there were few schools operating due to a revolving lack of funds, lack of interest, politics, and lack of educators.

In 1847 California was annexed from Mexico and become incorporated into the United States of America. At the time of American annexation there were only a few hundred literate residents in the state  out of a population of 26,000 for a 2% literacy rate. There were now funds available if the school existed. From 1854 onwards there was a steady public education system present throughout the state of California. Attendance was not compulsory or universal, for example, in San Diego attendance hovered at 25%. The classes taught at the primary level were orthography, reading, writing, grammar, geography, arithmetic, algebra, history, French, and Spanish. From this foundation the California education system expanded to form secondary schools, and institutions of higher learning. 

Santa Clara University, established in 1851 as the College of Santa Clara, is the oldest operating institution of higher education in California. The origins of the public higher education system began in 1857, with the establishment of the California State Normal School. This college eventually became San Jose State University, the first campus of the California State University to be established. In 1855, the College of California was established, which would eventually become the University of California, Berkeley, the first campus of the University of California to be established.

K–12

California is the most populous state of the U.S. and has the most school students, with over 6.2 million in the 2005–06 school year, giving California more students in school than 36 states have in total population and one of the highest projected enrollments in the country. About 25% of school students are English learners, compared to 9% nationally. A major problem for K-12 education in California is the high level of high school dropouts, especially among minority students. Approximately 22% of African Americans and Hispanic Californians are living in poverty and only 68% of students living below the poverty line will graduate from high school. The state of California has in place the Dropout Recovery and Prevention Act (SB 65) as a governmental way of dealing with the high dropout rate in California. It was implemented in 1985 and was expanded in 2004 due to its success in lowering the state's dropout rate. Senate Bill 65 initiated three new dropout prevention efforts: the Pupil Motivation and Maintenance Program, the Alternative Education Outreach Consultant (AEOC) Program, and the Educational Clinic Program.

According to Governor Jerry Brown in 2014, "almost 30% are either undocumented or don't speak English."

Funding levels, costs, and metrics

In 2016, California's K–12 public school per-pupil spending was ranked 22nd in the nation ($11,500/student vs. $11,800 for the US average).

For 2012, California's public schools ranked 48th in the number of employees per student, at 0.102 (the US average was 0.137), while paying the 7th most per employee, $49,000 (the US average was $39,000).

California public schools are funded through 4 main revenue streams: Local Control Funding Formula (LCFF), Federal Revenue, Other State revenue, and Other Local revenue. LCFF makes up the largest chunk of public school funding, including property and local taxes. Federal revenue is a significantly smaller portion of funding, given as part of free or reduced lunch programs and other federal-based aid programs.

Other state and local revenue make up less significant revenue streams. Schools receive a general, “basic aid” amount, based on a formula for the grades a school holds, number of students, etc… In a "basic aid" district, property taxes generate more revenue than the funding limit, a benchmark set by the state to qualify for additional funding. Of the 944 school districts in California, 80 are labeled basic aid, 40 of which are in the Bay Area.

Because LCFF is the largest portion of public school funding, schools capable of generating more LCFF funding often have more overall funding per student, but it’s those same districts that already have well-off families and students. This issue is prominent in East San Jose, CA, where Alum Rock Union School District receives about 25% less funding than Saratoga Union School District per student. Homes in the Alum Rock region sell for between $589,100 and $686,100 and Saratoga homes sell for over $2 million.

Public school facilities

Many public school facilities throughout California are in various stages of disrepair. In a report to the public, the federal government noted that 75% of California schools, 13,096 in total, were in need of renovation and modernization. Furthermore, the renovations and modernizations needed were required to elevate the schools standing/rating to "good". In a 2007 financial analysis report, published by the U.S. General Accounting Office, it was estimated that it would cost $112 billion to bring all K–12 public school buildings in line with building codes.

 In 2014 at a meeting of the Fremont School Board, Fremont, CA, it was made public that students could not study effectively due to the Heating and Air Conditioning (HVAC) not working.
 In 2003 students at Fremont High School in Los Angeles voiced their feelings of humiliation with regards to the needed repairs at their school.

Nonpublic Nonsectarian Schools

“Nonpublic, nonsectarian school” (NPS) means a private, nonsectarian school that enrolls individuals with exceptional needs pursuant to an individualized education program and is certified by the department. Unlike private schools, tuition for the NPS is paid for by the Local Educational Agencies (LEA) and the schools must conform to California Department of Education standards.

Universities and colleges

Public universities

The main state research university is the University of California (UC). The University of California has ten major campuses. Each major UC campus is headed by a chancellor that is appointed by the Regents of the University of California.

The ten major campuses of the University of California are located in Berkeley, Los Angeles, San Diego, Davis, Santa Cruz, Santa Barbara, Irvine, Riverside, Merced and San Francisco.  The University of California, San Francisco, teaches only graduate health-sciences students. The UC Hastings College of the Law, also in San Francisco, is affiliated with UC, but is not administered by the UC Regents. The UC system was originally intended to accept students from the top one-eighth (1/8th) of California high school graduates, however several of the schools in the UC system have become even more selective. The awarding of doctoral degrees from California public universities was originally intended to be the sole domain of the UC system, however several doctoral degrees are now also awarded by the Cal State system.

The University of California also administers one national laboratory directly for the United States Department of Energy: Lawrence Berkeley National Laboratory. The university indirectly manages Los Alamos National Laboratory through Los Alamos National Security, LLC and Lawrence Livermore National Laboratory through Lawrence Livermore National Security, LLC.

The California State University (CSU) system describes itself as the largest four-year public university system in the United States.  The CSU was originally intended to accept students from the top one-third (1/3rd) of California high school graduates, however several of the schools in the CSU system have become much more selective. Many of the larger campuses, such as Cal Poly, Cal Poly Pomona, Long Beach State, Cal State Fullerton, Cal State San Bernardino, Fresno State, Sacramento State, San Francisco State, San Diego State, and San José State (the oldest public university in California) have become more research oriented than they were in the past. A marked change and a shift from the California Master Plan for Higher Education began in 2007 with the CSU gaining the ability to grant doctoral level degrees in education (Ed.D.). The CSU has since gained the authority to grant many other Doctoral degrees, such as the Doctor of Nursing Practice, the Doctor of Physical Therapy, and the Au.D. The CSU also has the ability to grant joint Ph.Ds with other universities.  Kevin Starr (State Librarian emeritus) and others have argued that this small change is the beginning of a larger reorganization of higher education in California.

The California Community Colleges system provides lower division "General Education" courses, whose credit units are transferable to the CSU and UC systems, as well as vocational education, remedial education, and continuing education programs. It awards certificates and associate degrees. It is composed of 112 colleges organized into 72 districts, serving a student population of over 2.9 million.  The system also provides the education certification, basic training, and some advanced training to all police officers, fire fighters and Emergency Medical Tech's in the state either directly (via on campus academies) or indirectly (via affiliations with police / sheriff department's and fire department's "in house" academies).

Private universities

California has hundreds of other private colleges and universities, including many religious and special-purpose institutions. This leads to many unique entertainment and educational opportunities for residents. The San Francisco Bay area and greater Los Angeles have an abundance of these private universities, with some of the highest densities of post-secondary institutions in the world.

See also

 California Open Source Textbook Project
 Spanish bilingual education in California

References

External links
 Google: Public Data: Education Statistics of California